Long Island is an island  long, in a northeast–southwest direction, and  wide, lying opposite the mouth of Russell East Glacier and  south of Trinity Peninsula, Antarctica, in Prince Gustav Channel. It was discovered and named by the Falkland Islands Dependencies Survey in 1945; the name is descriptive.

See also 
 List of Antarctic and sub-Antarctic islands

References

Islands of Graham Land